Penrhyndeudraeth railway station is a railway station serving the small town of Penrhyndeudraeth on the Dwyryd Estuary in Gwynedd, Wales. It is a station on the Cambrian Coast Railway with services between Shrewsbury and Pwllheli via Machynlleth.

History

During construction, the A&WCR amalgamated with the Cambrian Railways, this being authorised on 5 July 1865 and effective from 5 August 1866. The section between Barmouth and  opened on 2 September 1867, and Penrhyndeudraeth station opened the same day.

In 2016, The Welsh Government funded the installation of a reinforced glass fibre 'hump' on the platform to improve access for wheelchair and pushchair users onto and off trains.

Services
Trains call here every two hours (approximately) on weekdays.

Notes

References

External links

 RAILSCOT on Aberystwith and Welsh Coast Railway

Railway stations in Gwynedd
DfT Category F2 stations
Former Cambrian Railway stations
Railway stations in Great Britain opened in 1867
Railway stations served by Transport for Wales Rail
Penrhyndeudraeth